Carlina Rivera (born January 3, 1984) is an American politician who represents the 2nd district of the New York City Council since 2018. She is a member of the Democratic Party. The district includes portions of the East Village, Gramercy Park, Kips Bay, Lower East Side, Murray Hill and Rose Hill in Manhattan.

Rivera was a candidate in the Democratic primary for New York's 10th congressional district in 2022.

Early life and education
Rivera grew up on the Lower East Side, where she was raised in Section 8 housing by a single mother who moved from Puerto Rico to mainland USA. She graduated from Notre Dame School in Manhattan and Marist College in Poughkeepsie, New York, where she majored in journalism.

Career
Rivera worked as director of programs and services at Good Old Lower East Side (GOLES), a local nonprofit organization focused on neighborhood housing and preservation, economic development, and community revitalization. She was also a member of Manhattan Community Board 3 and later served as the legislative director for Rosie Mendez.

New York City Council

2016-17 City Council campaign
Rivera launched her campaign for City Council in 2016, running for the 2nd District, which encompasses the East Village, Flatiron, Gramercy Park, Rose Hill, Kips Bay, Murray Hill and the Lower East Side. A first-time candidate who participated in public financing, she raised $176,000 through the City’s matching funds program. Rivera was endorsed by the Working Families Party, then City Public Advocate Letitia James, then City Comptroller Scott Stringer, Rep. Nydia Velazquez, and the City Council’s Progressive Caucus.

Rivera and her husband, Jamie Rogers, lived in a federally subsidized, low-income Section 8 apartment with an annual income limit of $61,050 for a family of two. Rogers, a former corporate lawyer at Sullivan & Cromwell, owns a growing coffee business, a Grand Street co-op apartment in Lower Manhattan, which he rents out, and a small family trust fund. Pictures of Rogers on his father  William P. Rogers Jr., a retired Partner at Cravath, Swaine & Moore, were deleted before the Democratic primary. Their eligibility was questioned as Rivera’s salary as a City Council staffer was $41,770, which means her husband would have had to earn less than $20,000 a year in order for the family to be under the limit. Rogers explained his financial situation in an interview with The Villager and defended their eligibility due to his struggling coffee business and substantial debt.

Rivera won the Democratic primary for New York City's 2nd City Council district in 2017 with 60.54% of the vote (8,354 votes). She went on to win the general election with 82.86% of the vote against Republican and perennial candidate Jimmy McMillan and several third-party candidates.

Tenure
In 2019, as a co-chair of the Women’s Caucus, Rivera was involved in securing $250,000 for the New York Abortion Access Fund to provide abortions for women not covered by insurance or Medicaid, including for those who travel from out-of-state. This funding made New York City the first to allocate money directly to abortion procedures. She has called for more aid to reach the city’s public hospital system, including funding and programs around reproductive healthcare. She also introduced a legislation to create a patient advocate’s office within the Department of Health and Mental Hygiene to help New Yorkers navigate the healthcare system.

In the same year, Rivera introduced legislations to create an Office of Active Transportation and Office of Pedestrians to assess conditions for safe biking and walking in the city and make recommendations for improvements. She introduced and passed a legislation to strengthen protections for renters during periods of maintenance, renovation, and construction. She introduced a legislation to require child protective specialists to explain to parents or caretakers about their rights during initial contact of an ACS investigation. and passed bills to outlaw the sale of foie gras and outlaw pigeon trafficking. In an effort to crack down on illegal hotel operators, she introduced a bill in June 2018 to require short-term rental companies such as Airbnb to report host data to the city. The bill passed the Council 45–0 and was signed into law by Mayor Bill de Blasio on August 6, 2018.

She was listed on City & State’s 2020’s Above and Beyond for her work on strengthening abortions rights and combating sexual harassment.

In June 2022, Rivera voted for a controversial $101 billion budget that will cut funding for the city's Department of Education by $600 million, citing "fundamental flaws" in the Fair Student Funding formula.

Rivera is Chair of the Council’s Committee on Hospitals and member of the Council's Women's Caucus, Progressive Caucus, and Black, Latino, and Asian Caucus.

2022 Congressional campaign
Rivera announced her candidacy for the U.S. House of Representatives in early June 2022 to represent the newly redistricted New York's 10th congressional district. She is the only candidate that currently lives outside the district but has said that she will move into it if elected. She has been endorsed by Rep. Nydia Velázquez, Rep. Adriano Espaillat, Brooklyn Borough President Antonio Reynoso, Manhattan Borough President Mark Levine, several City Council members, and unions such as 1199SEIU and Transport Workers Union of America.

Rivera is the only top candidate in the Democratic primary to not support allocating 100 percent of residential units in the proposed 5 World Trade Center in Lower Manhattan as affordable housing. She has raised a large amount of money from major real estate developers and lobbyists, including billionaire real estate developer Jed Walentas of Two Trees, Kirk Goodrich, Don Capoccia, Robert Levine of RAL Companies, Bruce Teitelbaum, and Daniel R. Tishman of Tishman Realty & Construction, the firm that managed the building of One World Trade Center. The New York Times reported she has reached out to at least two other executives in the real estate industry for donations as of August 2022, according to recipients of her outreach.

Rivera drew criticisms of treating LGBTQ+ New Yorkers as "political chess pieces" when she expressed support for religious exemptions that target members of the community in response to a question about her stance on the well-known same-sex wedding cake case in Colorado during an interview with Hamodia. Rivera said she has put religious exemptions in legislation in the past and is "willing to explore that and do it on the federal level." She walked back her statement and clarified that she opposes giving private businesses a pass on discriminating against LGBTQ+ people.

Rivera was met with backlash for seemingly inviting PAC money by adding a "red box" to her website. She was also called out by rival congressional candidate Dan Goldman for her investments in defense contractors Lockheed Martin and Northrop Grumman, as well as the gun company Smith & Wesson.

Rivera finished in fourth place in the crowded Democratic primary with 10,985 votes (17%), losing to Dan Goldman.

Electoral history

2022

2021

2017

Personal life
She and her husband, Jamie Rogers, a Connecticut College and Cornell Law School graduate, lived on the Lower East Side until June 2021 when they moved to Kips Bay for reasons they would not disclose publicly. On WNYC's Brian Lehrer Show, on January 11, 2022, she claimed that "the Lower East Side is my home."

Rivera was a member of the Democratic Socialists of America as of 2017 but is no longer.

See also
List of Democratic Socialists of America members who have held office in the United States

Notes

References

External links
Biography Councilwoman Carlina Rivera (official site)

1984 births
21st-century American politicians
21st-century American women politicians
American politicians of Puerto Rican descent
Candidates in the 2022 United States House of Representatives elections
Hispanic and Latino American city council members
Hispanic and Latino American New York City Council members
Hispanic and Latino American women in politics
Living people
Marist College alumni
Democratic Socialists of America politicians from New York
New York (state) Democrats
New York (state) socialists
New York City Council members
People from the Lower East Side
Puerto Rican people in New York (state) politics
Women New York City Council members